St. Stepanos Church was an Armenian church in Smyrna, Turkey.

St. Stepanos Church may also refer to several ruins in the Nakhchivan Autonomous Republic of Azerbaijan: 
St. Stepanos Church (Alahi)
St. Stepanos Church (Ashaghy Aylis)
St. Stepanos Church (Kələki)
St. Stepanos Church (Ordubad)
St. Stepanos Church (Yukhari Aylis)

See also
Sourp Stepanos Church, Larnaca, an Armenian Apostolic church in Cyprus
Lower Bethlehemi Church, also known as the Church of Saint Stepanos of the Holy Virgins, in Old Tbilisi, Georgia